Harrow Times is a British weekly local newspaper published by Newsquest, covering the London Borough of Harrow and surrounding areas.

The Harrow Times has been published since March 1997. It also has an online edition. Since the closure of Harrow Observer, the Times remains the only printed paper for Harrow.

References

External links

English-language newspapers
Newspapers published by Newsquest
Weekly newspapers published in the United Kingdom
Newspapers established in 1997
1997 establishments in England